Elliott Charng is a diplomat of the Republic of China. He is currently the representative to Australia.

Education
Charng obtained his bachelor's degree from National Chung Hsing University and master's degree in international affairs from George Washington University's Elliott School of International Affairs, in the United States.

Taipei Economic and Cultural Office in New Zealand
On 10 July 2013, Charng signed the Agreement between New Zealand and the Separate Customs Territory of Taiwan, Penghu, Kinmen and Matsu on Economic Cooperation (ANZTEC) with his New Zealand counterpart Stephen Payton in Wellington. The agreement comprises 25 chapters on bilateral trading matters between the two sides.

References

Living people
Elliott School of International Affairs alumni
Year of birth missing (living people)
National Chung Hsing University alumni
George Washington University alumni
Representatives of Taiwan to Australia
Representatives of Taiwan to India
Representatives of Taiwan to New Zealand